Elena of Bulgaria was an empress consort of Nicaea, married to Theodore II Laskaris (r. 1254–1258). She was daughter of Bulgarian Emperor Ivan Asen II and Anna Maria of Hungary.

Life 
Her maternal grandparents were king Andrew II of Hungary and Gertrude of Merania. On the paternal side, Emperor Ivan Asen I of Bulgaria and Elena of Bulgaria.

She was betrothed to Baldwin II of Courtenay, the last Latin emperor before marrying Theodore.

As part of an alliance between her father and the Nicaean emperor John III Vatatzes, negotiations began in 1233 on a marriage between her and Vatatzes' son and heir, Theodore II Laskaris. This took place finally in 1235 at Gallipoli. She died in the spring or summer of 1252.

Her husband died in 1258 and their son, John IV Laskaris, who was only seven years old, became emperor.

Family 
Elena and Theodore had five children:
 Irene Doukaina Laskarina, who married Constantine Tikh of Bulgaria (r. 1257-1277)
 Maria Doukaina Laskarina, who married Nikephoros I Komnenos Doukas of Epirus.
 Theodora, who married Matthew, Baron of Veligosti
 Eudoxia Laskarina Asanina, who married Guglielmo Peire de Ventimiglia
 John IV Laskaris, emperor between 1258 and 1261

References

Sources

1224 births
13th-century births
1252 deaths
13th-century deaths
13th-century Bulgarian women
13th-century Byzantine women
Bulgarian princesses
Laskarid dynasty
Empresses of Nicaea
Asen dynasty
Daughters of emperors
Mothers of Byzantine emperors